The biblical Battle of Mount Tabor takes place during the time of the Judges between the forces of King Jabin of Canaan who ruled from Hazor, and the Israelite army led by Barak and Deborah. It is recorded in the Book of Judges, chapters 4 and 5.

Biblical account

Background
The Israelites had been oppressed for twenty years by the Canaanite king Jabin, and by the captain of his army, Sisera, who commanded a force of nine hundred iron chariots. (According to Shiryan Zedakah, the Hebrew term should be properly translated as "Scythed Chariots"). At this time, the prophetess Deborah was judging Israel. She summoned the general Barak, telling him that God commanded him to march on Mount Tabor with an Israelite army and God promised him he would "deliver them" (the Canaanites) into Barak's "power".

Barak was hesitant and told Deborah that he would not undertake the campaign unless she accompanied him. The prophetess agreed to come, but scolded Barak, telling him that "you shall not gain the glory in the expedition on which you are setting out, for the Lord will have Sisera fall into the power of a woman." Deborah, Barak and the army gathered at Kedesh, its number rising to 10,000 warriors recruited from the tribes of Naphtali and Zebulun, who would have fought as light infantry and light cavalry.

The battle
The Israelites marched to Mount Tabor. Their movements were reported to Sisera, who hastened to the Wadi Kishon, near Mount Tabor. God caused a strong rainstorm which saturated the ground, causing the Canaanites heavy iron chariots to become stuck in the mud. Rain filled the streams on the mountain causing a flash flood at the Wadi Kishon, sweeping many away. The Canaanites panicked and fled, and the Israelites pursued them and slew them to the last man.

Sisera left his chariot and ran for his life. Sisera reached the tent of Yael, wife of Heber the Kenite, and she offered him shelter, as the Kenites were not at war with the Canaanites. Yael hid Sisera and gave him some milk to drink, but killed him after he fell asleep by pounding a tent peg through his temple. Thus, when Barak arrived in pursuit of Sisera, he found that Deborah's prophecy had been fulfilled.

References

Ancient Israel and Judah
Book of Judges
Mount Tabor
Mount Tabor
12th century BC
Mount Tabor
Late Bronze Age collapse
Tel Hazor
Mount Tabor